Blad Janb is a sub-district located in As Sawd District, 'Amran Governorate, Yemen. Blad al-Janb had a population of 2954 according to the 2004 census.

References 

Sub-districts in As Sawd District